Mappi Regency is a regency (kabupaten) in the Indonesian province of South Papua. It was split off from Merauke Regency (of which it had been a component part) on 12 November 2002. It covers an area of 25,609.94 km2, and had a population of 81,658 at the 2010 Census, 91,876 at the 2015 Intermediate Census, and 108,295 at the 2020 Census. The administrative centre is the town of Kepi.

Administrative districts
Mappi Regency in 2010 comprised ten districts (distrik). However, by 2015 the number of districts had been increased to fifteen; the five additional districts that have been created since 2010 are Bamgi, Passue Bawah, Syahcame, Ti Zain and Yakomi. 

The districts are listed below with their areas and their populations at the 2010 Census and that of 2015. The table also includes location of the district administrative centres, the number of administrative villages (rural desa and urban kelurahan) in each district, and its post code.

Note: (a) the 2010 populations of these areas were included in the figures for the original districts from which they were cut out.

References

External links
Statistics publications from Statistics Indonesia (BPS)

Regencies of South Papua